Jarmila Gajdošová and Arina Rodionova were the defending champions, but chose not to participate.

Wang Yafan and Xu Yifan won the title, defeating An-Sophie Mestach and Emily Webley-Smith in the final, 6–2, 6–3.

Seeds

Draw

References 
 Draw

Kangaroo Cup - Doubles
2015 in Japanese tennis
Kangaroo Cup